The Elcho Shield is an annual long range shooting competition between national teams of eight from England, Scotland, Ireland and Wales. The trophy holder was originally able to choose the venue of the competition, however, since the NRA's move to Surrey from Wimbledon in 1890, the competition has been held at Bisley Ranges, Surrey, England (now the National Shooting Centre).

The 2021 holder of the trophy is England.

Course of Fire
Unusually, no "sighting" or practice shots are permitted. The shooters may be coached which allows other team members to judge and make necessary adjustments to the shooter's sights. The rules allow each team two hours at each distance to fire all their shots. The match is most regularly held following the national championships in July each year.

History
In the event England won by 166 points. Scotland won the trophy for the first time in 1864 and Ireland joined the fray in 1865. By this time, the match had become a major sporting event in Victorian England, as important as The Boat Race or the Eton v Harrow cricket match at Lords. Wales did not compete until 1991.

The Elcho Shield is large and distinctive, made from a sheet of iron decorated with repousse scenes to a design by the artist G. F. Watts.  It was presented to the National Rifle Association by its founder and president, Lord Elcho.

See also 
 International Confederation of Fullbore Rifle Associations (ICFRA), the international sanctioning body for fullbore target rifle

References

External links
 National Rifle Club of Scotland - History of the Elcho
 GB Match Rifle Team - History of the Elcho

Sports trophies and awards
Rifle shooting sports
Sport in Surrey
Recurring events established in 1862
1862 establishments in the United Kingdom
National Rifle Association (United Kingdom)
British sports trophies and awards
Target shooting trophies and awards
Shooting competitions in the United Kingdom